Absolon is a 2003 post-apocalyptic science fiction thriller film directed by David Barto and starring Christopher Lambert, Lou Diamond Phillips, and Kelly Brook. The plot concerns a future society where the only hope for survival from a deadly virus is a drug called Absolon.

Plot
In 2010, a virus infected everyone on the planet, wiping out half the population. Absolon is a drug regimen everyone must now take to stay alive. One corporation controls the drug and Murchison (Ron Perlman) is its leader.

A corporate scientist, who was researching the virus, is found murdered. Norman Scott (Christopher Lambert) is the policeman assigned to investigate the crime. He eventually uncovers a conspiracy involving the scientist. He is given a partial dosage of the cure the scientist had been working on, but soon realizes he is in over his head as he is being hunted by an assassination team. Scott goes on the run with Claire (Kelly Brook), one of the murdered scientist's colleagues. They find out the assassins are employed by Murchison.

Scott discovers he is being chased down for the cure in his bloodstream. He is also able to kill the assassins chasing them. In the end, Scott finds out the cure he was carrying wasn't for the original virus, which had died out years ago, but a cure for the worldwide dependence on the addictive Absolon drug itself which had changed everyone's body chemistry to the point that they can't live without it.

Cast
 Christopher Lambert as Det. Norman Scott
 Lou Diamond Phillips as Agent Walters
 Kelly Brook as Dr. Claire Whittaker
 Ron Perlman as Murchison
 Roberta Angelica as Det. Ruth Bryant
 Trevor Smith as Vasquez
 James Kidnie as Doc
 Neville Edwards as Harris

Notes

External links

2003 films
2003 independent films
2000s science fiction thriller films
British independent films
British post-apocalyptic films
British science fiction thriller films
Canadian science fiction thriller films
English-language Canadian films
Canadian post-apocalyptic films
Films set in 2010
Films set in the future
Syfy original films
Canadian independent films
Medical-themed films
Films with screenplays by Brad Mirman
Films about drugs
2000s English-language films
2000s American films
2000s Canadian films
2000s British films